The 2010 NCAA Division I women's soccer tournament (also known as the 2010 Women's College Cup) was the 29th annual single-elimination tournament to determine the national champion of NCAA Division I women's collegiate soccer. The semifinals and championship game were played at WakeMed Soccer Park in Cary, North Carolina from December 3–5, 2010 while the preceding rounds were played at various sites across the country from November 12–28. 

Notre Dame defeated Stanford in the final, 1–0, to win their third national title. The Fighting Irish (21–2–2) were coached by Randy Waldrum.

The most outstanding offensive player was Melissa Henderson from Notre Dame, and the most outstanding defensive player was Jessica Schuveiller, also from Notre Dame. Henderson and Schuveiller, alongside nine other players, were named to the All-Tournament team. Henderson was also the tournament's leading scorer, with 3 goals and 4 assists.

Qualification

All Division I women's soccer programs were eligible to qualify for the tournament. The tournament field remained fixed at 64 teams.

Format
Just as before, the final two rounds, deemed the Women's College Cup, were played at a pre-determined neutral site. All other rounds were played on campus sites at the home field of the higher-seeded team. The only exceptions were the first two rounds, which were played at regional campus sites. The top sixteen teams hosted four team-regionals on their home fields (with some exceptions, noted below) during the tournament's first weekend.

National seeds

Teams

Bracket

Stanford Bracket

Portland Bracket

Maryland Bracket

North Carolina Bracket

College Cup

All-tournament team
Melissa Henderson, Notre Dame (most outstanding offensive player)
Jessica Schuveiller, Notre Dame (most outstanding defensive player)
Rose Augustin, Notre Dame
Courtney Barg, Notre Dame
Katie Baumgardner, Ohio State
Hanna Cerrone, Boston College
Mandy Laddish, Notre Dame
 Adriana Leon, Notre Dame
Camille Levin, Stanford
Emily Oliver, Stanford
Christen Press, Stanford

See also 
 NCAA Women's Soccer Championships (Division II, Division III)
 NCAA Men's Soccer Championships (Division I, Division II, Division III)

References

NCAA
NCAA Women's Soccer Championship
NCAA Division I Women's Soccer Tournament
NCAA Division I Women's Soccer Tournament
NCAA Division I Women's Soccer Tournament